María Caballero may refer to:
 María Cristina Caballero, Colombian journalist
 María Emilia Caballero, Mexican mathematician

See also
 , Cuban poet
Manuel María Caballero, Bolivian writer